Oksana Ekk (born 26 November 1974) is a Russian sprinter. She competed in the women's 200 metres at the 2000 Summer Olympics.

References

External links
 

1974 births
Living people
Place of birth missing (living people)
Russian female sprinters
Olympic female sprinters
Olympic athletes of Russia
Athletes (track and field) at the 2000 Summer Olympics
Goodwill Games medalists in athletics
Competitors at the 1998 Goodwill Games
Universiade silver medalists for Russia
Universiade medalists in athletics (track and field)
Medalists at the 1995 Summer Universiade
World Athletics Championships athletes for Russia
Russian Athletics Championships winners
20th-century Russian women
21st-century Russian women